João Almeida may refer to:

 João Almeida (footballer, born 1947), Brazilian footballer
 Joãozinho Almeida (born 1954), Brazilian footballer
 Joãozinho Neto (born 1980), Brazilian footballer
 João Augusto Ferreira de Almeida (1873–1917), executed Portuguese soldier
 João Carlos Almeida (born 1988), Portuguese track and field athlete
 João Almeida (cyclist) (born 1998), Portuguese cyclist
 João Tavares (born 1998), Portuguese footballer
 João Almeida (footballer, born 1993), Portuguese footballer